Camellia granthamiana, or Grantham's camellia, is a rare, endangered species of Camellia, which was first discovered in Hong Kong in 1955.

The distribution of the species is limited in both Hong Kong and Mainland China. Only one individual of the species was found at that time when it was discovered. A few more wild populations were found in Ma On Shan and also in Guangdong(including Shenzhen).

It was first discovered in the ravine of Tai Mo Shan in 1955 by AFCD. It was named in honour of the then Governor of Hong Kong, Sir Alexander Grantham.

Tai Mo Shan Montane Scrub Forest in the upper Shing Mun Valley was assigned as a Sites of Special Scientific Interest (SSSI) in 1975 as the forest supports this rare species and other species, Camellia waldenae, Amentotaxus argotaenia and many species of orchids.

In Hong Kong, it is a protected species under Forestry Regulations Cap. 96A.

See also 

 Hong Kong camellia

References

granthamiana
Flora of Hong Kong
Trees of China
Least concern plants
Plants described in 1956